Werleshausen is a village in the northern part of Hesse, Germany. First recorded mention was in 876. Since 1972 it belongs to the town of Witzenhausen.

Location
The village of Werleshausen lies in the Werra valley near the Hoher Meißner, right on the boundary with Thuringia, almost at Germany's geographical centre, 33 km east of Kassel. The Bebra-Göttingen railway crosses the village in the east.

Neighbouring villages
Werleshausen borders in the east on the municipalities of Lindewerra and Bornhagen (Thuringia's Eichsfeld district), in the south on the village of Oberrieden, in the west on the village Wendershausen and in the north on the villages of Unterrieden and Neuseesen (town of Witzenhausen).

Sightseeing
 Historic framework buildings in the village core
 Manor
 Ludwigstein Castle
 Hanstein Castle (Bornhagen)
 Devil's rock ("Teufelskanzel") near Lindewerra

Gallery

References

External links
 Homepage of Werleshausen  
 Homepage of Witzenhausen 

Werra-Meißner-Kreis